Jonathan Adams may refer to:

Jonathan Adams (American actor) (born 1967), American actor and voice actor
Jonathan Adams (British actor) (1931–2005), English actor
Jonathan Adams (architect) (born 1961), Welsh architect
Jonathan Adams (athlete) (born 1992), Paralympic athlete from England 
Jonathan Adams (American football) (born 1999), American football player
Jonathan Adams, American guitarist, part of the duo Montana Skies

See also
Jonathan Adam (born 1984), Scottish racing driver
Johnny Adams (1932–1998), American blues, jazz and gospel singer
John Adams (disambiguation)
John Adam (disambiguation)